The Pro-Truth Pledge is an initiative promoting truth seeking and rational thinking, particularly in politics.

History 
First published in December 2016, the pledge is a movement and initiative of the Rational Politics project of Intentional Insights, a nonprofit organization dedicated to promoting rational thinking and good decision making in various areas of life. The Pro-Truth Pledge is partially a reaction (and a would-be answer) to recent political trends in the US and UK, for example to alternative facts, growth of fake news and post-truth politics; all of which are seen as acute problems.

Founders 
The founders of Pro-Truth Pledge come from its mother organization, Intentional Insights. The behavior and social science methodologies behind the Pro-Truth Pledge were applied to the topic by Dr. Gleb Tsipursky, one of the founders of Intentional Insights.

Supporters and impact 
According to the project's home page, as of August 26, 2018, there are 8,374 signatories to the pledge, including 85 organizations, 625 government officials, and 850 public figures (including Jonathan Haidt, Michael Shermer, Steven Pinker and Pierre Whalon). The Pro-Truth Pledge has received media coverage.

Effectiveness 
At least two peer-reviewed studies have been conducted to determine the effectiveness of taking the Pro-Truth Pledge. 

A study published in the journal Behavior and Social Issues examined the sharing of news-related content on Facebook before and after taking the pledge.  The findings "suggest that taking the PTP had a statistically significant effect on behavior change in favor of more truthful sharing on Facebook."

Another study, published in the Journal of Social and Political Psychology, used a different methodology and reached a similar conclusion: "taking the pledge results in a statistically significant increase in alignment with the behaviors of the pledge."

Translations and pledge-takers by geography 
The pledge has been translated into Spanish, Hungarian, Russian, Ukrainian, Portuguese and German, but the map of the pledge takers shows that most (above 90%) of the pledge takers live in North America, mainly in the US.

References

External links 
 

Truth
Politics
Rationalism